Hoyt Richards (born April 10, 1962 in Syracuse, New York) is an American model and actor.

Richards became one of the biggest names in modeling in the late 1980s and 1990s. He appeared in hundreds of advertising campaigns and was photographed by Bruce Weber, Richard Avedon, Helmut Newton, Steven Meisel, Horst, and Albert Watson. His campaigns include Gianni Versace, Valentino, Gianfranco Ferré, Ralph Lauren, Burberry, Dunhill, Cartier, and Donna Karan.

In his last year of high school, Richards landed a scholarship which sent him to England to be educated in the sixth form of the English public school Haileybury. After Haileybury, Richards, a scholar-athlete, went to Princeton University from where he graduated in 1985 with a BA in Economics and played varsity football. At that stage, he had no plans to be a model. His focus was on football and school. But a shoulder injury lead him to New York to see a specialist. On that trip, he was told his football playing days were over but he was spotted by a casting director. Eventually, his trips to New York for auditions lead to him a meeting with the Ford Model Agency. Thus began his career as a male model. This career spanned over fifteen years and encompassed over 200 major ads and hundreds of commercials.

In the late 1990s, Richards moved from New York to Los Angeles to begin pursuing a career as an actor. He first appeared in the Harrison Ford/Anne Heche romantic comedy, Six Days, Seven Nights. Since then, he has since appeared in over a fifteen independent films including such award-winning projects as the comedy, Hit and Runway (1999) and the dramas, Taxi Dance (2009) and The Disciple (2010.)  In 2005, Richards, also a screenwriter, began his own production company, Tortoise Entertainment, that develops and produces television, documentary and film projects. In 2014, Tortoise produced a buddy comedy called Dumbbells that Hoyt wrote and starred.

Filmography

 2014 Dumbbells Writer, Producer
 2012 Continuity
 2010 The Disciple
 2010 Paradise Lost
 2010 Action News 5
 2010 The Gertrude Stein Mystery or Some Like it Art
 2011 Showgirls 2: Penny's from Heaven 
 2009 American High School 
 2009 Taxi Dance 
 2008 Dog Tags
 2006 Futbaal: The Price of Dreams
 2006 Transgressions
 2004 High Art, Low Life
 2003 Get Money
 1999 Hit and Runway
 1998 Distress Signals
 1998 Six Days, Seven Nights

Involvement in a cult 

In April 2018 the BBC World Service Outlook programme  broadcast an interview with Hoyt Richards. Outside working hours he was involved with a cult called Eternal Values. They believed there would be a catastrophe at the turn of the century and the group would have a crucial role to play. He describes in the programme how he came to realise that it was a cult that he had joined, its malevolent influence on him, how he struggled to free himself of it and then come to terms with what had happened to him. The BBC programme was re-broadcast in August 2020.

References

External links

Locke Management entry

Male models from New York (state)
1962 births
Living people
American male actors
People educated at Haileybury and Imperial Service College